Tetyana Mykolaïvna Lyakhovych (born 20 May 1979 in Holyn, Ivano-Frankivsk) is a female javelin thrower from Ukraine. Her personal best throw is 63.23 metres, achieved in July 2008 in Kyiv.

Achievements

References
 
 sports-reference

1979 births
Living people
Ukrainian female javelin throwers
Athletes (track and field) at the 2000 Summer Olympics
Athletes (track and field) at the 2004 Summer Olympics
Athletes (track and field) at the 2008 Summer Olympics
Olympic athletes of Ukraine
Olympic female javelin throwers
Sportspeople from Ivano-Frankivsk